Mastax thermarum is a species of beetle in the family Carabidae found in Asia and Europe.

Subspecies
 Mastax thermarum egorovi Lafer, 1973
 Mastax thermarum thermarum (Steven, 1806)

Distribution
The species has distribution in Armenia, Azerbaijan, Belgium, Georgia, Greece, Kyrgyzstan, Kazakhstan, Romania, Russia, Tadzhikistan, Turkmenistan and Uzbekistan.

References

Mastax thermarum
Beetles of Asia
Beetles of Europe
Beetles described in 1806